Chek Chek-e Shomali (also Romanized as Chek Chek-e Shomālī; also known as Chak Chak and Chek Chek) is a village in Mehregan Rural District, in the Central District of Parsian County, Hormozgan Province, Iran. At the 2006 census, its population was 48, in 11 families.

References 

Populated places in Parsian County